The North Caribbean Coast Autonomous Region is one of two autonomous regions in Nicaragua. It was created by the Autonomy Statute of 7 September 1987. It covers an area of 33,106 km2 and has a population of 541,189 (2021 estimate). It is the largest autonomous region or department in Nicaragua. The capital is Puerto Cabezas. It contains part of the region known as the Mosquito Coast.

The North Autonomous Caribbean Coast has a Regional Council of representatives of different political parties, such as the Sandinistas (FSLN) and YATAMA (ethnic indigenous party), as well as all the municipalities. They hold sessions in an Assembly in Puerto Cabezas.

The North Autonomous Caribbean Coast, in addition to Mestizos, contains populations from different indigenous groups, including the Miskitos, Mayangnas, and others. Regional official languages are Creole (Miskito Coast Creole and Rama Cay Creole), Miskito, Sumo (Mayangna and Ulwa), Garifuna, and Rama, in addition to the national official language of Spanish, most males in Puerto Cabezas speak some English from when it was a US fruit plantation.

Municipalities 
The RACCN contains eight municipalities:

Bonanza
Mulukukú
Prinzapolka
Puerto Cabezas
Rosita
Siuna
Waslala
Waspam

See also

 South Caribbean Coast Autonomous Region

References

External links 

 The autonomous regions of Nicaragua's Caribbean Coast
 From Conflict to Autonomy in Nicaragua: Lessons Learnt – report by Minority Rights Group International, April 2007

 
Autonomous regions of Nicaragua